Dead mileage, dead running, light running, empty cars or deadheading in public transport and empty leg in air charter is when a revenue-gaining vehicle operates without carrying or accepting passengers, such as when coming from a garage to begin its first trip of the day.

Similar terms in the UK include empty coaching stock (ECS) move and dead in tow (DIT).

The term deadheading also applies to the practice of allowing employees of a common carrier to use a vehicle as a non-revenue passenger. For example, an airline might assign a pilot living in New York to a flight from Denver to Los Angeles, and the pilot would simply catch any flight going to Denver, either wearing their uniform or showing ID, in lieu of buying a ticket. Also, some transport companies will allow employees to use the service when off duty, such as a city bus line allowing an off-duty driver to commute to and from work, free.

Additionally, inspectors from a regulatory agency may use transport on a deadhead basis to do inspections such as a Federal Railroad Administration inspector riding a freight train to inspect for safety violations.

Causes
Dead mileage routinely occurs when a route starts or finishes in a location away from a terminal or maintenance facility, and the start or end of a shift requires moving the vehicle without passengers.

Effects, prevention, and mitigation

Dead mileage incurs costs for the operator in terms of non-revenue earning fuel use, wages, and a reduction in the use of the driver's legal hours of driving.

Operators will often reduce dead mileage by starting or finishing the first or last service of the day, or shift, at a garage along the route, a so-called part service or part route. Dead mileage may also be reduced by the operation of routes specifically timed and routed to facilitate bus movements rather than the passenger need. Often changing routes slightly (and ensuring high on time performance) can greatly increase the useful time to deadhead ratio for both crew and vehicles.

Cutting-edge technology has been also leveraged to preempt dead miles and innovate ways to reduce those or in some cases replenish the empty or dead miles with revenue-generating backhaul. Artificial intelligence, machine learning, and data science have been known to be drawn upon in a connected platform to predict and then effectively allocate loads to a transport. All this happens in real-time and hence each on-demand request is met with extreme diligence. As the platform is connected and acts like an ecosystem, shippers and carriers benefit from end-to-end visibility that in turn enables them to search return loads at the current destination.

Dead mileage has increasingly become an issue with privatised competition for bus services, most notable with the privatisation of London bus services, where competing operators have to factor on the cost of dead mileage when bidding for specific routes away from their main garages. This is exacerbated by not being allowed to operate a service that may match the dead mileage route. This can be lessened to an extent by tendering routes in groups of sufficient size to justify opening/renting new garage space.

Often operators will come to an arrangement to share garage facilities to reduce dead mileage.

Some air charter companies are leasing out their planes at a lower rate for those empty leg flights to attract rentals of those originally non-revenue flights.

See also 
 Deadheading (employee)
 Positioning flight, a similar concept in aviation

References

Scheduling (transportation)
Transport operations
Public transport
Aircraft operations